Whispers is the fifth studio album from British singer-songwriter Passenger. It was released between 6 and 10 June 2015 in different countries  through Black Crow Records and Nettwerk. The album includes the singles "Scare Away the Dark" and "Heart's on Fire".

Background
On 26 March 2014 Passenger announced details of his fifth studio album, confirming the UK release date as 9 June 2014. When speaking to Digital Spy about the album he said, "This is easily the most 'up' album I've ever made, it's quite cinematic. There are lots of big stories and big ideas. There are also some sombre moments about loneliness and death but hey, it wouldn't be a Passenger album without those." He released "Heart's on Fire" as the lead single from the album on 14 April 2014.

Singles
"Heart's on Fire" was released as the lead single from the album on 14 April 2014. Talking to Digital Spy about the song he said, "Heart's on Fire' is a nostalgic song. It's about when the timing with someone isn't right, even though the person might be. And although you're not with that person at the time, there may be a moment in the future where the relationship makes more sense."

Critical reception

Whispers was met with a moderately positive reception from critics. At Metacritic, which assigns a normalised rating out of 100 to reviews from mainstream critics, the album received an average score of 63, based on 7 reviews, indicating "generally favorable reviews".

Caroline Sullivan of The Guardian gave praise to Rosenberg's "snaggle-toothed rasp" delivery throughout the record and the storytelling elements that invoke "characterful observations ("Bullets")" and "striking vignettes ("Riding to New York")". AllMusic editor Matt Collar gave the "Album Pick" title to the album, praising the instrumentals and lyrics concluding with, "Ultimately, with Whispers, Rosenberg has crafted an album of sweet, hummable anthems for tender-hearted troubadours everywhere." The New York Times music critic Jon Caramanica gave a mixed review of the album, saying that his voice "can be striking, even if its arsenal is limited," but found most of his lyrics were like a "teenager’s scribbled poems."

Commercial performance
The album debuted at No. 12 on Billboard 200, No. 5 on Top Rock Albums,  selling 18,000 copies in the first week. The album has sold 71,000 copies in the United States as of August 2016.

Album cover
"Whispers" received a 2015 Grammy nomination  for Best Recording Package. The art director, Sarah Larnach, was also the artist and designer on the album and credits Mike Rosenberg with creating the concept. "Whispers" is the third Passenger album cover created by Sarah Larnach.

Track listing

Charts

Weekly charts

Year-end charts

Release history

References

2014 albums
Passenger (singer) albums
Nettwerk Records albums